Tanjung Sepat (Jawi: تنجوڠ سڤات) is a town in Kuala Langat District, Selangor, Malaysia. It is on the Strait of Malacca. It is administered by the Zone 24 of the Kuala Langat Municipal Council. Kampung Kundang is a village located nearby.

Tanjung Sepat is primarily a fishing town. Most of the inhabitants have some kind of connection to the fishing industry, although the relative importance of fishing to the economy is dwindling due to pollution in the Straits of Malacca. Many locals  believe this is caused by the high amounts of pig-farming in the surrounding areas of the state.
The uncontrollable waste flowing to the sea produces not only stench but hardship for the fishing industry participants.

Tanjung Sepat is well known locally for its many seafood restaurants. The most famous dish is the seafood steamboat. Steamed buns, known as Baozi, are also well known in Tanjung Sepat. Many people visit Tanjung Sepat to buy buns during the holidays. People also visit the Gano Farm mushroom farm to view the various types of the mushrooms cultivated there. There is a couple's bridge in Tanjung Sepat, but it is broken.

References 

Kuala Langat District
Towns in Selangor